Asagirt (Amharic: አሳግርት) is one of the woredas in the Amhara Region of Ethiopia. Located at the eastern edge of the Ethiopian highlands in the Semien Shewa Zone, Asagirt is bordered on the southwest by Hagere Mariamna Kesem, on the northwest by Angolalla Tera, on the north by Basona Werana, on the northeast by Ankober, on the east by the Afar Region, and on the southeast by Berehet. The administrative center of this woreda is Gina Ager. Asagirt was part of former Angolalla Terana Asagirt woreda.

Demographics
Based on the 2007 national census conducted by the Central Statistical Agency of Ethiopia (CSA), this woreda has a total population of 48,371, of whom 24,674 are men and 23,697 women; 1,278 or 2.64% are urban inhabitants. The majority of the inhabitants practiced Ethiopian Orthodox Christianity, with 94.92% reporting that as their religion, while 5.01% of the population said they were Muslim.

Notes

Districts of Amhara Region